Asia Cargo Airlines (previously known as Tri-MG Intra Asia Airlines) is an airline that mainly operates cargo aircraft on scheduled routes for contract charters and non-scheduled routes for ad-hoc charters.

Tri-MG Airlines are based in Halim Perdanakusuma Airport, Jakarta, Indonesia.

Apart from cargo flight operations, they operate light aircraft for passengers as well. They also provide medical evacuation services (Medivac) for patients who require to be airlifted on special charters for hospitalisation and associated treatment.

History
The airline operates flights to Singapore, Balikpapan, Jayapura, Timika and Wamena. Aside from cargo, the airline also carries out Medical Evacuation Flights and Executive Jet charters throughout the Asia-Pacific region.

Destinations
Asia Cargo Airlines serves the following destinations:

 Balikpapan – Sultan Aji Muhammad Sulaiman Airport
 Jakarta – Halim Perdanakusuma International Airport Hub
 Majalengka – Kertajati International Airport 
 Pekanbaru – Sultan Syarif Kasim II International Airport

Singapore – Changi Airport

During the Covid-19 Pandemic, the airline operated cargo flights to Malaysia as well.

Johor Bahru – Senai International Airport
Kota Kinabalu – Kota Kinabalu International Airport
Kuala Lumpur – Kuala Lumpur International Airport

Fleet
The Tri-MG Intra Asia Airlines fleet includes the following aircraft:

Tri-MG Intra Asia Airlines previously operated the following aircraft (as of September 2009):

Incidents and accidents
 On 4 January 2005, while carrying out a relief operation to the tsunami-stricken area of Banda Aceh, a Boeing 737-2A9C (PK-YGM) struck a water buffalo that had entered the runway just as it was making its landing at Sultan Iskandarmuda Airport (Banda Aceh). This resulted in the main gear on the port side collapsing which damaged the gear and port engine. There were no injuries and the aircraft was declared a write-off and scrapped several months later.
 On 18 July 2017, a Boeing 737-300F registered as PK-YGG bounced and slid off from Runway 15 of Wamena Airport, Wamena. Although no one was killed or injured in the incident, the incident caused substantial damage on the plane.

References

External links

Official website

Airlines of Indonesia
Airlines formerly banned in the European Union
Cargo airlines